Johann Sebastian Bach is an East German miniseries which originally aired in four episodes on DDR 1 in 1985. It was produced to commemorate the three hundredth anniversary of the birth of the baroque composer Johann Sebastian Bach.

Selected cast
 Ulrich Thein as Johann Sebastian Bach
 Angelika Waller as Maria Barbara Bach
 Franziska Troegner as Anna Magdalena Bach
 Rosemarie Bärhold as Liese
  as Carl Philipp Emanuel Bach
 Hans-Peter Minetti as Christian Friedrich Henrici
  as Johann Matthias Gesner
 András Kozák as Leopold, Prince of Anhalt-Köthen
 Yvetta Kornová as Catharina Dorothea Bach

References

Bibliography
 Klossner, Michael. The Europe of 1500–1815 on Film and Television: A Worldwide Filmography of Over 2550 Works, 1895 Through 2000. McFarland & Company, 2002.

External links
 
 Film details, bach-cantatas.com

1985 German television series debuts
1985 German television series endings
1980s drama television series
German-language television shows
German biographical films
1980s biographical films
Television series set in the 18th century
Biographical television series
Cultural depictions of Johann Sebastian Bach
Bach, Johann Sebastian
1980s German films